El Segundo High School, or ESHS, is a four-year public high school located in El Segundo, California. It is the only secondary school incorporated by El Segundo Unified School District.

First built in 1927, the school campus contains 5 main buildings built from a brick facade.

Demographics 
As of 2019–2020 1,231 students attend the school. The grade breakdown follows:

The student population is about 49% white, 24% Hispanic, 14% two or more races, 6.4% Asian, 6.0% black, and less than 1% each Native Hawaiian/Pacific Islander and American Indian/Native Alaskan.

Media 

El Segundo High School has a presence in the movie industry. Many films and television broadcasts were shot at the high school. The major movies and television broadcasts are shown below, in order from recent releases to old releases.
 ‘’Alexa & Katie’’ (2018)
 All American (2018)
 The Babysitter (2017)
 Blue Lagoon: The Awakening (2012)
 90210 (2008-2013)
 Role Models (2008)
 Superbad (2007)
 Yours, Mine, & Ours (2005)
 The O.C. (2003-2007)
 Joan of Arcadia (2003-2005)
 The Hot Chick (2002)
 Moving (1988)
 WarGames (1983)
 Blackboard Jungle (1955)
It Happened in Brooklyn (1947)

Athletics 
Below are notable sports the school offers (but is not limited to this list) in alphabetical order
 American Swimming
 Won Division 3 and Division 2 CIF championships back to back (2010-2011)
 Baseball
 Basketball
 Cross Country
 Football
 Soccer (Association Football)
 Tennis
 Track and field
 Volleyball
 Water Polo
 Color Guard / Winter Guard

Notable alumni

 
 Bobby Beathard, NFL general manager
 Pete Beathard, AFL-NFL-WFL quarterback
 George Brett, Hall of Fame baseball player
 Ken Brett, MLB pitcher 
 Joe Caravello, NFL tight end
 Derryl Cousins, MLB umpire 
 Keith Erickson, NBA player and broadcaster 
 Scott McGregor, MLB pitcher
 Bob Meistrell, co-founder of the Body Glove wetsuits and Dive and Surf dive store 
 George Myatt, professional baseball player/coach/manager
 Lars Nootbaar, professional baseball player
 Jim Obradovich, NFL tight end
 Zak Shinall, professional baseball player
 James B. Sikking, actor
 Billy Traber, MLB pitcher
 John Van Hamersveld, graphic designer

References

External links

 

High schools in Los Angeles County, California
El Segundo, California
Public high schools in California
Educational institutions established in 1927
1927 establishments in California